Aristide Blais  (October 18, 1875 – November 10, 1964) was a Canadian physician and Senator.

Early life
Aristide Blais was born on October 18, 1875 in Berthier, Quebec to Narcisse Blais and Philomène Buteau. He attended Laval University earning a Bachelor of Science and medical degree in 1899. Blais did two years of post-graduate medical studies in Paris. He married Antoinette Bolduc on April 9, 1903 and they had one daughter together. He later married Marie Moriarty and they also had one daughter together. Early in his medical career, Blais partnered with French-Canadian physician and Senator Philippe Roy in practice.

During the First World War Blais served as a captain in the Canadian Army Medical Corps, later promoted to lieutenant-colonel, and was appointed in charge of the No. 6 Casualty Clearing Hospital in Saint-Cloud, France. During his time he also served with the 38th Battalion and the 11th Field Ambulance Corps.

Political life
Blais was summoned to the Canadian Senate in 1940 by Prime Minister Mackenzie King. A Liberal, he represented the senatorial division of St. Albert, Alberta. Blais publicly noted his appointment to the Senate was a tribute to French Canadians in Alberta, and a fulfillment of former Prime Minister Wilfrid Laurier's promise upon Alberta entering Confederation in 1905, that French Canadians in the province would always have a Senate representative.

Blais served until his death on November 10, 1964 at 89 years of age, at Shaughnessy military Hospital in Vancouver, British Columbia.

See also
 List of Alberta senators

References

External links
 

1875 births
1964 deaths
Canadian senators from Alberta
Franco-Albertan people
Liberal Party of Canada senators
20th-century Canadian legislators
20th-century Canadian physicians
Canadian Expeditionary Force officers
Université Laval alumni